Sybilla integra is a species of longhorn beetle in the Cerambycinae subfamily. It was described by Fairmaire and Germain in 1859. It is known from Chile and western Argentina.

References

Bimiini
Beetles described in 1859